In enzymology, a glycine N-acyltransferase (GLYAT), also known as acyl-CoA:glycine N-acyltransferase (ACGNAT), is an enzyme that catalyzes the chemical reaction

  

Thus, the two substrates of this enzyme are acyl-CoA and glycine, whereas its two products are CoA and N-acylglycine.  This enzyme belongs to the family of transferases, specifically those acyltransferases transferring groups other than aminoacyl groups.  The systematic name of this enzyme class is acyl-CoA:glycine N-acyltransferase. Other names in common use include glycine acyltransferase, and glycine-N-acylase.

This enzyme plays a prominent role in converting benzoic acid (benzoate) into hippuric acid (N-benzoylglycine). Benzoic acid is metabolized by butyrate-CoA ligase into an intermediate product, benzoyl-CoA, which is then metabolized by glycine N-acyltransferase into hippuric acid.

References

 
 
 

EC 2.3.1
Enzymes of unknown structure